The Unanswered Question: Some Intimations of the American Composer Charles Ives is a ballet made by Eliot Feld to Charles Ives' The Unanswered Question, Calcium Light Night, Fugue in Four Keys, Mists, From the Housatonic at Stockbridge, Sonata No. 2 for Piano and Violin (In the Barn), Remembrance and An Old Song Deranged. The premiere took place April 30, 1988, at the New York State Theater, Lincoln Center, as part of New York City Ballet's American Music Festival with lighting by the Feld Ballet's Allen Lee Hughes and Willa Kim's costumes. Other works to the music of Ives in the City Ballet repertory include Peter Martins' Calcium Light Night, Jerome Robbins' Ives, Songs and George Balanchine's Ivesiana.

Original cast

   
 Valentina Kozlova
 Buffy Miller
 Leslie Roy
 
 Damian Woetzel
 Albert Evans
 Jeppe Mydtskov
 James Sewell

See also
 List of ballets by title

Footnotes

External links

Reviews
NY Times review by Anna Kisselgoff, May 2, 1988
NY Times review by Jennifer Dunning, January 7, 1989
NY Times review by Jennifer Dunning, May 1, 2006

1988 ballet premieres
Ballets by Eliot Feld
Ballets to the music of Charles Ives
New York City Ballet repertory
New York City Ballet American Music Festival